Yeray Luxem (born 1986 in Belgium) is an athlete from Belgium, who has been competing in triathlon since 2004.

Notable achievements 

5th Overall place Xterra Europe 2014 (http://www.xterraeurope.com/ranking14/)

2nd Overall place Xterra Europe 2013 (http://www.xterraeurope.com/uploadedfiles/2013EuropeanPoints.pdf)

References

 www.xterraeurope.com
 www.xterraplanet.com
 www.luxem.be
 www.triathlon.org

Belgian male triathletes
1986 births
Living people
Date of birth missing (living people)